Ghowsabad (also Romanized as Ghows̄ābād) is a village in Akhtachi-ye Mahali Rural District, Simmineh District, Bukan County, West Azerbaijan Province, Iran. At the 2006 census, its population was 96, in 19 families.

References 

Populated places in Bukan County